Tomorrow's Yesterday is a short film written and directed by Elan Gale.

It was produced by Page One Pictures in association with Sascha Rasmussen, Paul McCarthy-Boyington, Patrick O'Sullivan, and Angelo Perez, who were also the actors in the film.

Premiered on March 2, 2006, in Florence, Alabama, it has since played in 14 other film festivals worldwide. Other actors in the film include Efren Ramirez, Sam Sarpong, Michael A. Williams and Bridget Marquardt.

External links

2006 films
2006 comedy-drama films
2006 short films
American comedy-drama films
2000s English-language films
2000s American films
English-language comedy-drama films
Comedy-drama short films